Shyauli Bazaar in Karapu, Ward No.9 Lamjung District is located at the river Middim Khola, 30 km east of Pokhara in Nepal.  The tiny village is inside the range of the geographic middle of Nepal. 
geo:lat=28.103935006866482 geo:lon=84.22874987125397

A trekking path  that starts at the Begnas Lake east of Pokhara leads alongside the village and up 
to Nalma and Kudi at the Annapurna Round Trek.
In Shyauli Bazaar is the only Search and Rescue Dog Handlers Academy in South East Asia.

Populated places in Lamjung District
Himalayas